Carlos Eduardo Montes Cisternas (born 11 May 1946) is a Chilean politician and economist who served as President of the Senate of Chile from 2018 to 2019.

References

External links
 BCN Profile

1946 births
Chilean people
20th-century Chilean economists
Christian Democratic Party (Chile) politicians
Popular Unitary Action Movement politicians
Socialist Party of Chile politicians
Party for Democracy (Chile) politicians
Pontifical Catholic University of Chile alumni
Senators of the LV Legislative Period of the National Congress of Chile
Presidents of the Senate of Chile
Living people